Stepan Anikiyevich Degtyarev (Степан Аникиевич Дегтярёв) (17665 May 1813), was a renowned Russian composer of the late 18th century. He was most famous for his nationalistic Russian Choral Music.

His oratorio Minin and Pozharsky - or the Liberation of Moscow (1811) concerned the 1612 liberation of Moscow from Polish occupation during the Time of Troubles interregnum by the Second Zemschina Army led by Kuzma Minin-Sukhoruk, a fishmonger, and Prince Dmitry Pozharsky.

Works, editions and recordings
Works
 Oratorio Minin and Pozharsky - or the Liberation of Moscow «Минин и Пожарский, или освобождение Москвы» 1811

Recordings
 Minin and Pozharsky - or the Liberation of Moscow, Conductor Sergei Skripka, The Moscow Philharmonic Orchestra, Melodiya 1990 (2CD)

References

 Ritzarev, Marina (2006), Eighteenth-Century Russian Music (Ashgate)

External links
Book on Degtiarev

1766 births
1813 deaths
People from Belgorod Oblast
People from Belgorod Governorate
Russian classical composers
Russian male classical composers
Ukrainian classical composers
18th-century classical composers
18th-century male musicians
18th-century musicians
19th-century classical composers
Ukrainian people in the Russian Empire
19th-century male musicians